{{DISPLAYTITLE:C21H29NO2}}
The molecular formula C21H29NO2 (molar mass: 327.46 g/mol, exact mass: 327.219829 u) may refer to:

 Butorphanol, an opioid analgesic
 Norelgestromin, a progestin medication

Molecular formulas